May I Help You? is a South Korean television series directed by Shim Soo-yeon and starring Lee Hye-ri and Lee Jun-young. It premiered on MBC TV on October 19, 2022, and aired every Wednesday and Thursday at 21:50 (KST).

Synopsis
Butler Kim (Lee Jun-young), a man who replaces errands that start at 100 won per day, and Baek Dong-ju (Lee Hye-ri), a funeral director who grants the wishes of the dead, running an errand company.

Cast

Main
 Lee Hye-ri as Baek Dong-ju, a funeral director who gives everything in order to fulfill the last wishes of the deceased.
 Lee Jun-young as Butler Kim/Kim Tae-hee, the only employee of Ildangbaek, which is a daily errand service.

Supporting

Ildangbaek House
 Song Duk-ho as Seo Hae-ahn, a police officer.
 Lee Kyu-han as Vincent, the youngest and troubled uncle of Butler Kim and the CEO of Ildangbaek.

Eonju University Hospital Funeral Hall
 Tae In-ho as Im Il-seop, a funeral director.

Dong-ju's family
 Park Soo-young as Baek Dal-sik, Baek Dong-ju's father.
 Oh Dae-hwan as Michael Baek, Baek Dong-ju's uncle and chief priest of Bongsu-dong Temple.

Dong-ju's friends
 Seo Hye-won as Yoo So-ra, Baek Dong-ju's friend.
 Ahn Hyun-ho as Hyun Jeong-hwa

Extended
 Han Dong-hee as Tak Chung-ha, Butler Kim's ex-girlfriend and doctor of emergency medicine.
 Ahn Nae-sang as Kim Jun-ho, the taxi driver died in an accident and lost the trust of his son.
 Jo Ah-young as Park Seo-rin, a Student who died young from illness.
 Kim Ha-eon as Kim Jun-ho, Kim Tae-hee's younger brother.

Special appearance 
 Seo Young-hee as Choi Yeon-hee

Original soundtrack

Part 1

Part 2

Viewership

Notes

References

External links
  
 May I Help You? at Daum 
 
 

MBC TV television dramas
Korean-language television shows
2022 South Korean television series debuts
2022 South Korean television series endings
South Korean fantasy television series
South Korean romantic comedy television series
Television series by IWill Media
Wavve original programming